Polo TV is Polish-speaking TV station, largely focusing on music, particularly music by Lemon Records. The Internet test broadcasting of the channel started 11 April 2011, 7 May 2011 was the formal launch date.

On December 4, 2017, Telewizja Polsat Sp. z o.o. as a result of the agreement concluded with the ZPR Media Group, it acquired 100% of shares in Lemon Records, which is the broadcaster of the station, thus becoming one of its Owned.

References

External links
 

Television channels and stations established in 2011
Television channels in Poland
Music television channels
Music organisations based in Poland